Abdullah Maqdes (born 31 March 1987) is a Kuwaiti tennis player.

Maqdes has a career high ATP singles ranking of 496 achieved on 11 February 2013. He also has a career high ATP doubles ranking of 581 achieved on 4 February 2013. Maqdes has a career high combined juniors ranking of 18.

Maqdes made his ATP main draw debut at the 2010 Dubai Tennis Championships in the doubles draw.

Maqdes represents Kuwait in the Davis Cup where he has a W/L record of 43–21.

Maqdes represented the University of Southern California (USC) where his team won the NCAA title in 2010.

ATP Challenger and ITF Futures finals

Singles: 4 (1–3)

Doubles: 10 (4–6)

External links

1987 births
Living people
Kuwaiti male tennis players
Sportspeople from Kuwait City
Tennis players at the 2006 Asian Games
Asian Games competitors for Kuwait